Amin Amidu Sulemana is a Ghanaian diplomat and politician. He is the Member of Parliament for the Sissala West constituency in Ghana. He was also the  Minister for Roads and Highways in Ghana.

Aminu Amidu Sulemana was the Ghanaian ambassador to Egypt until he was appointed Upper West Regional Minister by President Mills in January 2012 following a cabinet reshuffle. He won the Sissala West constituency seat on the ticket of the National Democratic Congress in the December 2012 election and took his seat in the Parliament of Ghana on 7 January 2013. He was appointed Minister for Roads and Highways by President Mahama in January 2013.

Early life 
Amidu was born on 20 October 1955 in Gyawia in the Upper West Region of Ghana. He attended Nandom Senior High School (formerly Nandom Secondary School) in his region where he sat for his General Certificate Examination (GCE). He proceeded to further his studies at Kwame Nkrumah University of Science and Technology, Kumasi to pursue his Bachelor of Science degree in mechanical engineering. He worked as an engineer before going into politics in 1992.

Political career 
He was elected into the first parliament of the fourth republic of Ghana on 7 January 1993 after he was pronounced winner at the 1992 Ghanaian parliamentary election held on 29 December 1992.

Amidu was re-elected into the second parliament of the fourth republic on 7 January 1997 after he was declared winner at the 1996 Ghanaian General Election having defeated Moses Dani Baah of the People's National Convention and Solomon Salia Nmangu of the New Patriotic Party. He obtained 44.00% of the total valid votes which is equivalent to 16,688 votes while his oppositions claimed 33.20% which is equivalent to 12,589 votes and 3.00% which is equivalent to 1,150 votes respectively. His tenure ended on 6 January 2001.

2012 election 
After years of serving as the ambassador to Egypt, Amidu decided to go back into parliament and became the standard bearer for the National Democratic Congress once again to represent his newly formed constituency Sissala West constituency. He defeated Patrick Al-hassan Adamahof the New Patriotic Party, Bayirga Haruna of the People's National Convention and Abu Fatawu of the New Democratic Party. He obtained 50.29% of the total valid votes which is equivalent to 11,294 votes while his opponents claimed 36.26% which is equivalent to 8,144 votes, 13.10% which is equivalent to 2,943 votes and 0.34% which is equivalent to 77 votes respectively.

See also
Sissala West
List of Mills government ministers
National Democratic Congress

References

Living people
Ghanaian Muslims
Place of birth missing (living people)
National Democratic Congress (Ghana) politicians
Government ministers of Ghana
Ghanaian MPs 2013–2017
Ambassadors of Ghana to Egypt
Ghanaian MPs 1997–2001
People from Upper West Region
1955 births